Catholic Central High School is a college preparatory high school in Grand Rapids, Michigan.

Athletics
The Catholic Central Cougars compete in the Ottawa-Kent Conference. School colors are royal blue and white. The following Michigan High School Athletic Association (MHSAA) sanctioned sports are offered:

Baseball (boys) 
Basketball (girls and boys) 
Bowling (girls and boys) 
Competitive cheerleading (girls) 
Cross country (girls and boys) 
Football (boys) 
Golf (girls and boys) 
Ice hockey (boys)
Lacrosse (girls and boys) 
Skiing (girls and boys) 
Soccer (girls and boys) 
Softball (girls) 
Swim and dive (girls and boys) 
Tennis (girls and boys) 
Track and field (girls and boys)
Volleyball (girls) 
Wrestling (boys)

Notable alumni
 Vince Agnew, football player
 George Andrie, football player Dallas Cowboys
 Owen Bieber, President, United Auto Workers
 Brandon Dillon, chairman of the Michigan Democratic Party
 Obi Ezeh, football player University of Michigan
 Mike Kadish, football player Miami Dolphins
 Michael Keller, football player Dallas Cowboys
 Jalen Mayfield, football player, Atlanta Falcons
 Wally Pipp, baseball player, New York Yankees
 Joe Soboleski, football player
 Wm. Stage, journalist

References

External links
GR Catholic Central's Website
Catholic Secondary Schools' Website

Educational institutions established in 1906
Schools in Grand Rapids, Michigan
Catholic secondary schools in Michigan
Roman Catholic Diocese of Grand Rapids
1906 establishments in Michigan